Julian Larcombe Schley (February 23, 1880 – March 29, 1965) was a Chief of Engineers of the U.S. Army, who also served as Governor of the Panama Canal Zone.

Biography
Schley was born in Savannah, Georgia on February 23, 1880. He attended the Lawrenceville School in New Jersey, graduating in 1898. Schley graduated from the United States Military Academy at West Point in June 1903 and was commissioned in the Corps of Engineers.

He and classmate Douglas MacArthur had their first service with the 3d Battalion of Engineers in Compton from 1904 to 1905. Schley later served with engineer troops in the United States and Cuba; as an instructor at the Military Academy; as Assistant Engineer, Washington, D.C.; and as New Orleans District Engineer.

During World War I, he commanded the divisional 307th Engineers in the St. Mihiel and Meuse-Argonne offensives and was Engineer, 5th Army Corps, during the last two weeks of the latter drive. He received a Distinguished Service Medal for his service during the war.

Schley was Director of Purchase, General Staff, and a member of the War Department Claims Board from 1919 to 1920. Schley later served four-year tours as Galveston District Engineer; Engineer of Maintenance, Panama Canal; and Governor of the Canal Zone.  In the latter post, he was also military advisor to the Republic of Panama. Schley was Commandant of the Army Engineer School in 19361937. In October, 1937, Schley was named as Chief Engineer of the U.S. Army Corps of Engineers. He retired on September 30, 1941.

Schley was recalled to active wartime duty in 1943 as Director of Transportation, Office of the Coordinator of Inter-American Affairs. He served until December 31, 1945 before retiring again.

Schley died March 29, 1965 at Walter Reed Hospital in Washington, D.C., aged 85. He was interred at Arlington National Cemetery four days later.

Notes

References

This article contains public domain text from

External links
Generals of World War II

1880 births
1965 deaths
Lawrenceville School alumni
United States Military Academy alumni
Military personnel from Savannah, Georgia
20th-century American engineers
United States Army Corps of Engineers personnel
United States Military Academy faculty
United States Army personnel of World War I
Recipients of the Distinguished Service Medal (US Army)
Canal executives
Governors of the Panama Canal Zone
United States Army generals
United_States_Army_Corps_of_Engineers_Chiefs_of_Engineers
United States Army generals of World War II
Burials at Arlington National Cemetery